Kynosarion was a coastal town of ancient Pamphylia, inhabited during Roman times.

Its site is located between Magydos and Side, in Asiatic Turkey.

References

Populated places in ancient Pamphylia
Former populated places in Turkey
Roman towns and cities in Turkey
History of Antalya Province